The Journal of Veterinary Medical Education is a peer-reviewed academic journal publishing research and discoveries in the field of veterinary medical education, It is the official journal of the Association of American Veterinary Medical Colleges (AAVMC), published four times a year by the University of Toronto Press.

Abstracting and indexing
The journal is abstracted and indexed in:
 AGRICOLA
 Biomedical Reference Collection: Corporate
 Crossref
 EBSCO Electronic Journals Service
 JCR: Science Edition
 MEDLINE Complete with Full Text
 NA Publishing Inc.
 ProQuest
 Scholars Portal
 Scopus
 Synergies
 US National Library of Medicine

References

External links

Veterinary medicine journals
University of Toronto Press academic journals
Quarterly journals
Publications established in 1973
English-language journals